TSSM may refer to:
 Titan Saturn System Mission
 Type III secretion machinery
 Two-spotted spider mite
 The Spectacular Spider-Man
 The Spectacular Spider-Man (TV series)
 The SpongeBob SquarePants Movie, particularly the video game of the same name